is a railway station located in Ibusuki, Kagoshima, Japan. The station is unmanned and opened in 1960.

Lines 
Kyushu Railway Company
Ibusuki Makurazaki Line

Adjacent stations 

Railway stations in Kagoshima Prefecture
Railway stations in Japan opened in 1960
Ibusuki, Kagoshima